Deirdre Codd is a camogie player, Senior debut in 2004 v antrim. winner of All Ireland senior medals in 2007 in 2010 and 2011., 2012. Deirdre's mother, Ruth Hatton, represented Wexford Junior camogie team and father, John, was a camogie referee. Her family are heavily involved in greyhound racing and coursing.

Other awards
She won National League medals in 2009, 2010 and 2011. She was an All Star nominee in 2005, 2007, 2009 All Star Nominee; Purcell Cup All Star 2008; Leinster Under-14 1999, 2000; Leinster Under-16 2000, 2002; Club Intermediate 2001, 2003 (captain); Club Senior 'B' 2009; Leinster and Winner of All-Ireland Senior medals at College level with Coláiste Bríde 2003, 2004; represented Ireland in second level Compromise Rules v. Scotland 2004; Leinster Senior 2004, 2007; Leinster Junior 2004; Purple and Gold Star 2008.

References

External links
 Camogie.ie Official Camogie Association Website
 Wexford Wexford camogie site

1986 births
Living people
Wexford camogie players